William Hood is an art historian and the Mildred C. Jay Professor of Art Emeritus at Oberlin College, where he taught from 1974 through 2007. Professor Hood taught the history of Italian Renaissance Art in Columbia University's Department of Art History and Archaeology from 2008 through 2010. He is currently teaching art history seminars at the New York University Institute of Fine Arts.

Research
His research interests center around Italian Renaissance art, as well as the art of 17th and 18th century France, Italy, and Spain.  He has published on a variety of subjects in Renaissance and Baroque art. His book, Fra Angelico at San Marco, published by Yale University Press, won the 1993 George Wittenborn Memorial Book Award, the 1994 Eric Mitchell Prize and was a finalist in the Premio Salimbeni Competition in Italy. His book-in-progress is entitled Made Men: Afterlives of the Classical Nude.

Education and scholarship
Professor Hood received his B.F.A. and M.F.A. at the University of Georgia.  He did his doctoral work at the New York University Institute of Fine Arts in New York and was awarded a Ph.D. in 1977.

He has taught at Oberlin College since 1974 and holds the endowed Mildred C. Jay professorship in art history.  He is a fellow at the American Academy in Rome, as well as the Harvard University Center for Italian Renaissance Studies at the Villa I Tatti in Florence, where he held two visiting professorships from 1989–90 and from 1999-2000.

He is also a 2005 recipient of an Andrew W. Mellon fellowship at the Metropolitan Museum of Art in New York City.

External links
Publisher Page for Fra Angelico at San Marco
Oberlin College "Faculty Expert" Page
Professor Hood at Columbia University
 William Hood Fine Arts
 Professor Hood at New York University Institute of Fine Arts

Oberlin College faculty
New York University Institute of Fine Arts alumni
University of Georgia alumni
Living people
Harvard Fellows
Year of birth missing (living people)